St. Peter's Pro-Cathedral is a Catholic church located in Richmond, Virginia, United States. It is the oldest Catholic church in the city. From the erecting of the Diocese of Richmond in 1850 until the completion of the Cathedral of the Sacred Heart in 1906, St. Peter's Church served as the cathedral and seat of the diocese. Originally, the church was predominantly Irish American. The church continued to serve a congregation of approximately 300 as of 2011.

After the Civil War, St. Peter's basement hosted the city's "colored Catholics." The 13-member congregation included Emily Mitchell (born into slavery in 1824, brought from Baltimore and later serving Bishop James Gibbons), Julia Grandison (baptised in Georgia and brought to Richmond at age 9), Moses Marx (who began driving Bishop John Keane's buggy at age 12), Liza Marx (who learned to read and reminded the judge reading her mistress' will that he forgot the lines bequeathing money to Elizabeth Thompson and her next child of issue), and Julia Flippen as well as her children. When the congregation had increased to about 50, including children, Bishop Keane signed a deed for what became St. Jos Church on Shockoe Hill, also inviting the Josephites for help in furthering the Black apostolate.

In 2020 the parish was designated a pro-cathedral as part of the Diocese of Richmond bicentennial celebration.

Gallery

See also
List of Catholic cathedrals in the United States
List of cathedrals in the United States

References

19th-century Roman Catholic church buildings in the United States
Roman Catholic churches completed in 1834
Roman Catholic churches in Richmond, Virginia
Former cathedrals in the United States
Irish-American culture in Virginia
Irish-American history
National Register of Historic Places in Richmond, Virginia
Neoclassical architecture in Virginia
Churches on the National Register of Historic Places in Virginia
Roman Catholic cathedrals in Virginia
Neoclassical church buildings in the United States

Society of St. Joseph of the Sacred Heart